The 2015 Kyrgyzstan League was the 24th season of Kyrgyzstan League, the Football Federation of Kyrgyz Republic's top division of association football. Dordoi are the defending champions, having won the previous season.

Teams

Note: Table lists in alphabetical order.

Foreign players

League table

Results

First round

Second round

Top scorers

Hat-tricks

 4 Player scored 4 goals

References

External links
 Rsssf.com Statistics.

Kyrgyzstan League seasons
1
Kyrgyzstan
Kyrgyzstan